Bentley High School may refer to:

Bentley High School (Burton, Michigan), a school in Burton, Michigan
Bentley High School (Livonia, Michigan), a school in Livonia, Michigan